The Luxembourg national under-17 football team is the under-17 football team of Luxembourg. It is controlled by the Luxembourg Football Federation.

Current squad
 The following players were called up for the 2023 UEFA European Under-17 Championship qualification matches.
 Match dates: 25 – 31 October 2022
 Opposition: ,  and Caps and goals correct as of:''' 25 October 2022, after the match against 

}

See also
 Luxembourg Football Federation
 Luxembourg national football team
 Football in Luxembourg

References

European national under-17 association football teams
under-17